Sixmile Island is an alluvial island in the Allegheny River in Allegheny County in the U.S. state of Pennsylvania. It is part of O'Hara Township, and lies across the river from Pittsburgh.

References

External links
U. S. Army Corps of Engineers Navigation Charts

River islands of Pennsylvania
Islands of the Allegheny River in Pennsylvania
Islands of Allegheny County, Pennsylvania